The Andaman Tamils are Tamil-speaking people of the Andaman and Nicobar Islands, commonly known as the Madrasi (after Madras, erstwhile name of Chennai). There are three groups. The first are those who migrated from Tamil Nadu in search of livelihood and are found in almost all the islands where human beings are settled. The second are Tamil-speaking repatriates from Myanmar who migrated after the military junta came to power in the then Burma. The third group are Tamil-speaking repatriates from Sri Lanka who migrated after ethnic clashes began there. The population of the first group is largest and is still swelling as the migration continues.

Andaman Tamils speak Tamil at home and use Tamil script when writing. With non-Tamils, they speak in a sort of local Hindi, often referred to as Andaman Hindi. Educated Tamils speak in English too. Most Andaman Tamils enjoy privileges under the category of "local" residents. The Andaman and Nicobar Islands have about 100,000 Tamils.

Chola empire
From 800 to 1200 CE, the Tamil Chola dynasty created an empire that eventually extended from southeastern peninsular India to parts of Malaysia. Rajendra Chola II took over the Andaman and Nicobar Islands and maintained them as a strategic naval base to launch a naval expedition against the Srivijaya empire (a Hindu-Malay empire based on the island of Sumatra, Indonesia).

Census
According to the information furnished by the Andaman and Nicobar Administration, the population of different linguistic groups recorded in the census of 1971 was as under:

 Bengali 28114 
 Nicobarese 17955 
 Tamil 14518 
 Hindi 13982 
 Malayalam 13916 
 Telugu 9361 
 Urdu 2588 
 Punjabi 1024 
 Oriya 250 
 Kannada 201 
 Marathi 115 
 Gujarati 159 
 Assamese 17 
 Sindhi 7 
 Kashmiri 8 
 Others 12918

See also
 Andamanese peoples

References

Sources

History & Culture. The Andaman Islands with destination quide
India Home Department. The Andaman Islands: with notes on Barren Island. C.B. Lewis, Baptist Mission Press, 1859 read online or download

External links

 Official Andaman and Nicobar Tourism website
 Official Andaman District website

Culture of the Andaman and Nicobar Islands
A
A